HD 96919, also known by its Bayer designation of z2 Carinae and the variable star designation of V371 Carinae, is a blue supergiant star in the constellation Carina. It lies near the Carina Nebula and at a comparable distance.

V371 Car is an α Cyg variable, erratically pulsating and changing brightness by a few hundredths of a magnitude. Periods of 10–80 days have been identified. It shows unusual emission lines in its spectrum, and high-velocity absorption (HVA) events, temporary spectral features that are thought to indicate localised regions of enhanced mass loss.

HD 96919 is a B9 supergiant, possibly located 6,000 light-years from Earth. It is considered to be a post-red supergiant star, either evolving towards a Wolf–Rayet star or on a blue loop before returning to a cooler temperature.

References

Carina (constellation)
Alpha Cygni variables
B-type supergiants
Carinae, z2
Carinae, V371
CD-61 02941
096919
054461
4338
Gould objects